Aneurinae is a subfamily of flat bugs in the family Aradidae. There is at least 1 genus, Aneurus, in Aneurinae.

References

Further reading

 
 
 
 
 
 
 
 

Aradoidea